Hilda Beemer Kuper (née Beemer; 23 August 1911 – 23 April 1992) was a social anthropologist most notable for her extensive work on Swazi culture. 
She started studying the Swazi culture and associating with the Swaziland's royal family after we was awarded with a grant by the International African Institute of London. She studied and illustrated Swazi traditions embodied in the political vision of King Sobhuza II, who later became a close friend. King Sobhuza II personally awarded Kuper with Swazi citizenship in 1970.

Early life
Born to Lithuanian Jewish and Austrian Jewish parents in Bulawayo, Southern Rhodesia, Kuper moved to South Africa after the death of her father. She studied at the University of the Witwatersrand and, afterwards, at the London School of Economics under Malinowski.

Doctoral fieldwork and anthropological career
In 1934, Kuper won a fellowship from the International African Institute to study in Swaziland. In July of that year, while at an education conference in Johannesburg, she met Sobhuza II, paramount chief and later king of Swaziland. With assistance from Sobhuza and Malinowski, Kuper moved to the royal village of Lobamba and was introduced to Sobhuza's mother, the queen mother Lomawa. Here Kuper learned siSwati and pursued her fieldwork. This phase of Kuper's researches into Swazi culture culminated in the two-part dissertation, An African Aristocracy: Rank among the Swazi (1947) and The Uniform of Colour: a Study of White–Black Relationships in Swaziland (1947).

In the early 1950s, Kuper moved to Durban. During that decade, she focused her studies on the Indian community in the Natal region, as summarised in Indian People in Natal (1960). In 1953, Kuper received a senior lectureship at the University of Natal in Durban. In addition to her academic work, together with her husband, Leo Kuper, she helped to found the Liberal Party in Natal

In 1961 the Kupers moved to Los Angeles, to escape the harassment of liberals that was increasingly prevalent in apartheid South Africa, and to enable Leo to accept a professorship in sociology at UCLA. In 1963 Kuper published The Swazi: a South African Kingdom and was herself appointed professor of anthropology at UCLA. Kuper was a popular teacher, and In 1969 won a Guggenheim fellowship.

In 1978, Kuper published an extensive, official biography of Sobhuza II, King Sobhuza II, Ngwenyama and King of Swaziland.

Awards

Personal life
Kuper married Leo Kuper in 1936. They had two daughters, Mary and Jenny. Her nephew, Adam Kuper, is also an anthropologist.

Publications

References

External links

Archive at the University of California

1911 births
1992 deaths
People from Bulawayo
Alumni of the London School of Economics
Liberal Party of South Africa politicians
Rhodesian emigrants to South Africa
Rhodesian Jews
Rhodesian novelists
Social anthropologists
South African Jews
South African people of Lithuanian-Jewish descent
South African people of Austrian-Jewish descent
South African anthropologists
South African women anthropologists
Swazi culture
University of California, Los Angeles faculty
University of the Witwatersrand alumni
Rhodesian people of Lithuanian-Jewish descent
Jewish scholars
20th-century anthropologists